Terraform is the second full-length record by Shellac, released in 1998.

Track listing

Artwork
Credited to:
Courtesy Estate of Chesley Bonestell
Space Art Museum
Smithsonian Institution

Personnel
Steve Albini - guitar/vocals
Robert S. Weston IV - bass/vocals
Todd Trainer - drums

References

Shellac (band) albums
1998 albums
Touch and Go Records albums